Diacetylverrucarol is a natural trichothecene produced by the fungus Myrothecium verrucaria.  Chemically, it is an acetate derivative of verrucarol.

Herbicide use 
Trichothecenes have been found to cause growth retardation, wilting, chlorosis, and necrosis in some plants.
It can work in poor conditions, even where there is very little or no moisture. Diacetylverrucarol is undergoing study for its successful effects at reducing or killing the kudzu weed. It is prepared through liquid fermentation of Myrothecium verrucaria mycelium after which it can be used as a pesticide. This causes very little harm to the plants that the kudzu plant displaces. Results appeared within 24 hours and the kudzu plant's roots were diseased after 14 days. In greenhouse experiments the fungus killed 100 percent of the kudzu seeds, and, in outdoor trials, 90-100 percent of older plants. The fungus is undergoing study to reduce the diacetylverrucarol presence to reduce side effects.

Because it is a trichothecene, it has significant toxicity. If swallowed by humans, the initial symptoms are general discomfort, dry eyes, and drowsiness. If a larger dose is consumed, symptoms of a hemorrhagic fever will occur, as well as mental impairment. Other animals are susceptible as well, and can experience growth retardation, reproductive disorders, and vomiting if the substance is consumed.

References 

Trichothecenes
Acetate esters
Epoxides
Herbicides